Jean-Marc Roberts (3 May 195425 March 2013) was a French editor, novelist, and screenwriter.

Life
He started writing in the early 1970s. He was awarded the 1973 Fénéon Prize for Samedi, dimanche et fêtes (English: Saturday, Sunday and holidays), and, in 1979, the Prix Renaudot for his novel Affaires étrangères (English: Foreign Affairs). He was an editor for Seuil, the Mercure de France and Fayard and a director of Editions Stock.

He died of cancer on 25 March 2013.

Bibliography
Samedi, dimanche et fêtes, Le Seuil, 1972. (Prix Fénéon, 1973)
Baudelaire et les voleurs, Julliard, 1973.
Le Sommeil agité, Le Seuil, 1977.
Les Enfants de fortune, Le Seuil, 1978.
Affaires étrangères, Le Seuil, 1979. (Prix Renaudot, 1979)
L'Ami de Vincent, Le Seuil, 1982.
Portrait craché, Le Seuil, 1983.
Méchant, Le Seuil, 1985.
Mon père américain, Le Seuil, 1988.
L'Angoisse du tigre, Le Seuil, 1990.
Les Seins de Blanche Neige, Grasset, 1993.
Affaires personnelles, Grasset, 1996.
Monsieur Pinocchio, Julliard, 1998.
Un début d'explication, Le Seuil, 2000.
Une petite femme, Grasset, 2000.
Toilette de chat, Le Seuil, 2003.
Les Bêtes curieuses, réédition, Balland, 2003.
Je te laisse, Le Seuil, 2004.
Cinquante ans passés, Grasset, 2006. 
La Prière, Flammarion, 2008. 
François-Marie, Gallimard, 2011.

Screenplays
Une étrange affaire de Pierre Granier-Deferre, 1981, after his Affaires étranges.
Que les gros salaires lèvent le doigt! by Denys Granier-Deferre, 1982, after his Les Bêtes curieuses.
L'Ami de Vincent by Pierre Granier-Deferre, 1983, after his novel.
Cours privé by Pierre Granier-Deferre, 1986.
Elles n'oublient jamais (Love in the Strangest Way) by Christopher Frank, 1993.
Faux et usage de faux
La Couleur du vent
 les gros salaires levent le doigt!!!

References

External links
"Every day at Orly", Paris-Lifestyle,
"Jean-Marc Roberts, après le tremblement de terre", Lire, 01/06/2000

"Jean-Marc Roberts", French wikipedia

1954 births
2013 deaths
Prix Renaudot winners
Writers from Paris
French editors
French male screenwriters
French screenwriters
French male novelists
20th-century French novelists
Prix Fénéon winners
20th-century French male writers
French male non-fiction writers